Juan Carlos Espinoza Mercado (born 23 July 1987, in Machala) is an Ecuadorian professional football player who has played for Ecuadorian club Liga Deportiva Universitaria de Loja and in 2010 he joined Peruvian club Juan Aurich.

International career

Identity case
In January 2013, he was called into the 2013 South American Youth Championship for the Peruvian U20 team. He played in four games under the name of Max Barrios Prado before it was reported that he had used false documentation that implied that the player was 17 years old. The Civil Registry of Ecuador released documentation showing that the player was 25 years old and married. He was withdrawn from the competition.

The rumours were initially reported by someone who claimed to be a friend of 'Maradona', the former player of Palma de Huacho and apparent father of 'Max Barrios'. The person claimed Maradona told him that the U20 player was from "Colombia or Ecuador" and that 'Maradona' is not the player's father.

Jaime Villavicencio, President of Universitaria de Loja club confirmed that the player in the U20 competition is the same person as the one who played for Universitaria de Loja. The Peruvian club Juan Aurich have passed information on to their lawyers as the player signed a contract with Juan Aurich using false documentation.

References 

1987 births
Living people
People from Machala
Ecuadorian footballers
L.D.U. Loja footballers
C.D. Cuenca footballers
Juan Aurich footballers
Ecuadorian expatriate footballers
Expatriate footballers in Peru
Association football defenders